Anastasiya Andreevna Rakhmangulova (Ukrainian: Анастасія Андріївна Рахмангулова; born 30 December 1994 in Mykolaiv) is a Ukrainian chess player who received the FIDE title of Woman International Master (WIM) in 2012.

Anastasia is 20 times Champion of Ukraine among girls in different age categories.

In 2012, she tied for the third place in the European Girls' Under-18 Chess Championship in Prague.

Anastasiya won the Women's Ukrainian Chess Championship and Ukrainian Women's Championship (blitz) in 2015 in Lviv.

References 

 Ukrainian Women's Championship (blitz) — 2015
 Ukrainian Women's chess Championship 2015

External links 
 
 
 

1994 births
Living people
Ukrainian female chess players
Sportspeople from Mykolaiv